The 2023 ICC Women's T20 World Cup was held in South Africa in February 2023. The following squads were announced for the tournament.

Australia
Australia announced their squad on 10 January 2023.

Coach:  Shelley Nitschke

 Meg Lanning (c)
 Alyssa Healy (vc, wk)
 Darcie Brown
 Ashleigh Gardner
 Kim Garth
 Heather Graham
 Grace Harris
 Jess Jonassen 
 Alana King
 Tahlia McGrath
 Beth Mooney (wk)
 Ellyse Perry
 Megan Schutt
 Annabel Sutherland
 Georgia Wareham

Bangladesh
Bangladesh announced their squad on 21 January 2023.

Coach:  Hashan Tillakaratne

 Nigar Sultana (c, wk)
 Rumana Ahmed
 Dilara Akter
 Marufa Akter
 Nahida Akter
 Shorna Akter
 Jahanara Alam
 Disha Biswas
 Fargana Hoque
 Fahima Khatun
 Murshida Khatun
 Salma Khatun
 Lata Mondal
 Ritu Moni
 Sobhana Mostary
 Shamima Sultana

Rabeya Khan, Sanjida Akter Meghla, Fargana Hoque and Sharmin Akhter were named as travelling reserves.

England
England announced their squad on 6 January 2023.

Coach:  Jon Lewis

 Heather Knight (c)
 Lauren Bell
 Maia Bouchier
 Alice Capsey
 Kate Cross
 Freya Davies
 Charlie Dean
 Sophia Dunkley
 Sophie Ecclestone
 Sarah Glenn
 Amy Jones (wk)
 Katherine Sciver-Brunt
 Nat Sciver-Brunt
 Lauren Winfield-Hill (wk)
 Danni Wyatt

Danielle Gibson and Issy Wong were named as travelling reserves.

India
India announced their squad on 28 December 2022.

Coach:  Hrishikesh Kanitkar

 Harmanpreet Kaur (c)
 Smriti Mandhana (vc)
 Yastika Bhatia (wk)
 Harleen Deol
 Rajeshwari Gayakwad
 Richa Ghosh (wk)
 Shikha Pandey
 Sneh Rana
 Jemimah Rodrigues
 Anjali Sarvani
 Deepti Sharma
 Renuka Singh
 Devika Vaidya
 Pooja Vastrakar
 Shafali Verma
 Radha Yadav

Sabbhineni Meghana, Sneh Rana and Meghna Singh were named as travelling reserves. On 23 February 2023, Sneh Rana was added to the main squad after Pooja Vastrakar was ruled out of the tournament due to an upper respiratory tract infection.

Ireland
Ireland announced their squad on 10 January 2023.

Coach:  Ed Joyce

 Laura Delany (c)
 Rachel Delaney
 Georgina Dempsey
 Amy Hunter
 Shauna Kavanagh (wk)
 Arlene Kelly
 Gaby Lewis
 Louise Little
 Sophie MacMahon
 Jane Maguire
 Cara Murray
 Leah Paul
 Orla Prendergast
 Eimear Richardson
 Rebecca Stokell
 Mary Waldron

On 3 February 2023, Rebecca Stokell was ruled out of the tournament due to a foot ligament injury and was replaced in the squad by Rachel Delaney.

New Zealand
New Zealand announced their squad on 19 January 2023.

Coach:  Ben Sawyer
 Sophie Devine (c)
 Suzie Bates
 Bernadine Bezuidenhout (wk)
 Eden Carson
 Lauren Down
 Maddy Green
 Brooke Halliday
 Hayley Jensen
 Fran Jonas
 Amelia Kerr
 Jess Kerr
 Molly Penfold
 Georgia Plimmer
 Hannah Rowe
 Lea Tahuhu

Pakistan
On 14 December 2022, the Pakistan Cricket Board (PCB) were the first team to announce its squad.

Coach:  Mark Coles

 Bismah Maroof (c)
 Muneeba Ali (wk)
 Sidra Ameen
 Aiman Anwer
 Diana Baig
 Nida Dar
 Tuba Hassan
 Sadia Iqbal
 Javeria Khan
 Ayesha Naseem
 Sidra Nawaz (wk)
 Aliya Riaz
 Fatima Sana
 Nashra Sandhu
 Sadaf Shamas
 Omaima Sohail

Ghulam Fatima, Kainat Imtiaz and Sadaf Shamas were named as traveling reserves. On 21 January 2023, Sadaf Shamas was added to the main squad after Diana Baig was ruled out of the tournament due to a fractured finger.

South Africa
South Africa announced their squad on 31 January 2023.

Coach:  Hilton Moreeng

 Suné Luus (c)
 Chloe Tryon (vc)
 Anneke Bosch
 Tazmin Brits
 Nadine de Klerk
 Annerie Dercksen
 Lara Goodall
 Shabnim Ismail
 Sinalo Jafta (wk)
 Marizanne Kapp
 Ayabonga Khaka
 Masabata Klaas
 Nonkululeko Mlaba
 Delmi Tucker
 Laura Wolvaardt

Micaéla Andrews, Tebogo Macheke and Tumi Sekhukhune were named as non-travelling reserves.

Sri Lanka
Sri Lanka announced their squad on 1 February 2023.

Coach:  Rumesh Ratnayake

 Chamari Athapaththu (c)
 Nilakshi de Silva
 Kavisha Dilhari
 Vishmi Gunaratne
 Ama Kanchana
 Achini Kulasuriya
 Sugandika Kumari
 Kaushini Nuthyangana
 Oshadi Ranasinghe
 Inoka Ranaweera
 Harshitha Samarawickrama
 Sathya Sandeepani
 Anushka Sanjeewani (wk)
 Tharika Sewwandi
 Malsha Shehani

West Indies
West Indies announced their squad on 1 February 2023.

Coach:  Courtney Walsh

 Hayley Matthews (c)
 Shemaine Campbelle (vc, wk)
 Aaliyah Alleyne
 Shamilia Connell
 Britney Cooper
 Afy Fletcher
 Shabika Gajnabi
 Chinelle Henry
 Trishan Holder
 Zaida James
 Djenaba Joseph
 Chedean Nation
 Karishma Ramharack
 Shakera Selman
 Stafanie Taylor
 Rashada Williams

On 17 February 2023, Britney Cooper was added to the main squad after Chedean Nation was ruled out of the tournament due to knee injury.

References

ICC Women's World Twenty20 squads
squads